"Heartbeats" is a song by Swedish electronic music duo the Knife. It was released in Sweden on 27 December 2002 as the lead single from their second studio album Deep Cuts (2003) and re-released on 4 October 2004.

The song was listed at number 15 on Pitchfork Media's top 500 songs of the 2000s and at number 87 on Rolling Stones top 100 songs of the 2000s.  In October 2011, NME placed it at number 95 on its list "150 Best Tracks of the Past 15 Years". Adjectives used to describe the music were "haunting" and "electro". In Robert Dimery's book 1000 Songs: You Must Hear Before You Die,  it was said: "The Stockholm siblings' love of synth pop, minimal beats and electronica create together a moving masterpiece. Singer Karin Dreijer Andersson's hypnotic vocals recall both Björk and Siouxsie Sioux with her icy delivery of magical lines".

The song has been covered by many acts such as José González, Royal Teeth, Scala & Kolacny Brothers, Amason and Ellie Goulding.

Critical reception
The song has received critical acclaim since its release. MusicOMH said that the song's "emotive lyrics merge with forward thinking production to create one of the most exciting electronica releases of the year", and Contactmusic.com stated the song had "clever synth beats and Björkesque vocals" with the ability to "instil some fun and nostalgia into music." Gigwise.com said that the song was "perhaps one of the most hypnotic and haunting electronic songs of recent times, [...] innately infectious from the outset." Several reviews commented that the song had a 1980s feel.

Track listings
 UK CD "Heartbeats" (original) – 3:53
 "Heartbeats (Rex the Dog Remix)" – 6:12
 "Heartbeats (The Knife Techno Remix)" – 2:47
 "Afraid of You" – 3:48

 UK 12-inch vinyl'''
 "Heartbeats" (original) – 3:53
 "Heartbeats (Style of Eye Remix)" –
 "Heartbeats (Rex the Dog Remix)" – 6:12
 "Heartbeats (The Knife Techno Remix)" – 2:47

Personnel
 Christoffer Berg – mixing
 Rex the Dog – re-mixing, producer
 Linus Eklow – re-mixing

Charts

José González version

Argentine-Swedish singer-songwriter José González covered "Heartbeats" for his debut studio album, Veneer'' (2003), and released as its lead single in January 2006. In contrast to the electronic, synth-based original, González's cover features only an acoustic classical guitar. The song peaked at number nine on the UK Singles Chart following its use in an advertisement for the Sony Bravia television, in which countless colorful balls bounce down a hill.

Charts

Weekly charts

Year-end charts

Certifications

Release history

References

2002 singles
2002 songs
2004 singles
2006 debut singles
The Knife songs
Shock Records singles
Songs written by Karin Dreijer
Songs written by Olof Dreijer
V2 Records singles